The 1936 United States presidential election in Montana took place on November 3, 1936 as part of the 1936 United States presidential election. Voters chose four representatives, or electors to the Electoral College, who voted for president and vice president.

Montana voted overwhelmingly for the Democratic nominee, President Franklin D. Roosevelt, over the Republican nominee, Kansas Governor Alf Landon. Roosevelt won Montana by a landslide margin of 41.69% and remains the only presidential candidate ever to sweep every county in the state. , this was the last election in which Beaverhead County, Sweet Grass County, Stillwater County, Powder River County, and Fallon County voted for a Democratic presidential candidate.

Results

Results by county

See also
 United States presidential elections in Montana

Notes

References

Montana
1936
1936 Montana elections